Thomas Lindsay Shaffer (April 4, 1934 – February 26, 2019) was a lawyer, professor, legal ethics scholar, dean of the Notre Dame Law School, and the most prolific American legal author, having written over 300 scholarly works.

Early life and education
Thomas L. Shaffer was born in 1934 in Billings, Montana, and grew up in Wyoming before attending Fruita Union High School in Colorado. He grew up and was baptized a Baptist, but then converted to Roman Catholicism. Shaffer served in the U.S. Air Force in the 1950s. He received his B.A. from the University of Albuquerque in 1958 and his J.D. from Notre Dame Law School in 1961, cum laude, and he was ranked first in his class and was chosen as editor-in-chief of the law review, the Notre Dame Lawyer. In 1983, he received an honorary LL.D. from St. Mary's University.

Career
Before becoming a professor, Shaffer worked as an attorney with Barnes, Hickam, Pantzer & Boyd from 1961 to 1963 in Indianapolis. Starting in 1963 Shaffer began teaching estate planning at Notre Dame Law School, and then served as associate dean from 1969 to 1971 and as dean from 1971 to 1975.  Between 1980 and 1988 Shaffer served as the Robert E.R. Huntley Professor of Law at Washington and Lee University School of Law and as the director of the school's Frances Lewis Law Center. In 1988 Shaffer returned to Notre Dame as a full professor and then focused on clinical ethical instruction through the Notre Dame Legal Aid Clinic serving the underprivileged in the South Bend area. Shaffer served as a visiting professor of law at U.C.L.A., University of Virginia, University of Maine, and Boston College Law School. He wrote nearly 300 works in various areas of the law including legal ethics, Christianity and the law, estate planning, mediation and other. He was a member of the Society of Christian Ethics, the Jewish Law Association, the AALS Executive Committee, and the ABA accreditation Committee, on the board of advisors of the Journal of Law and Ethics. The Thomas L. Shaffer Public Interest Fellowship at Notre Dame Law School is named in his honor.

Major works
Legal Interviewing and Counseling in a Nutshell  
On Being a Christian and a Lawyer (Brigham Young University Press, 1981)
The Planning and Drafting of Wills and Trusts 
Lawyers, Clients, and Moral Responsibility
Property Law: Cases, Materials and Problems

References

1934 births
2019 deaths
People from Montana
People from Wyoming
Notre Dame Law School alumni
Notre Dame Law School faculty
American Roman Catholics
University of Albuquerque alumni
20th-century American lawyers